

This is a list of notable defectors from North Korea to South Korea. In total, 31,093 North Korean defectors had entered South Korea. By 2020 the number had grown to about 33,000. The dates shown below are the dates that the defectors arrived in South Korea.

1950s
 1953
No Kum-sok, a fighter pilot, flew his MiG-15 to the South. Since this fighter plane was then the best the Communist bloc had, No's defection was considered an intelligence bonanza, and he was awarded the then high sum of $100,000 and the right to reside in the United States.

1960s
 1968
 Kim Shin-jo – on 21 January, one of a 31-person team sent to the South to assassinate then-President Park Chung-hee. This led to retaliation in what is known as the Silmido incident. After his life was spared, he has become a missionary and has written books on how he found inner peace in Christianity.

1980s
 1982
 Ri Han-yong – nephew of Kim Jong-il; shot to death in 1997 in Gyeonggi-do by unknown assailants widely suspected to be North Korean agents, in what was variously speculated to be an attempt to silence him after his publication of a tell-all book about Kim Jong-il's private life, revenge for his mother Song Hye-rang's defection a year earlier, or a warning to fellow defector Hwang Jang-yop. His mother Seong Hye-rang (sister of Song Hye-rim, the mistress of Kim Jong-il and mother of Kim Jong-nam) defected to Europe in 1996 while his sister had defected to the South in 1992. 
1987
 Kim Hyon-hui – planted the bomb that brought down Korean Air Flight 858, but defected to South Korea after being caught in Bahrain and attempting suicide.
1989
Lee Sang-jo, a former North Korean Ambassador to Russia and Army general defected.

1990s
 1992
 Kang Chol-hwan – Due to North Korea's policy of collective punishment, Kang was imprisoned at age 9 along with his entire family after his father, a Zainichi Korean who'd returned to North Korea, was accused of treason. Kang was released ten years later, fled to China alongside his friend and fellow Yodok internee An Hyuk and defected to South Korea in 1992, where he became a prominent human rights activist and a columnist at The Chosun Ilbo.
 An Hyuk – He formerly lived as an expatriate in China, and repatriated to North Korea in 1986; however, he was accused of spying, and imprisoned at the Yodok concentration camp. He was released three years later, fled to China alongside his friend and fellow Yodok internee Kang Chol-hwan and defected to South Korea in 1992.
Lee Soon-ok – high-ranking party member from northern province defected with her son to South Korea via China and Hong Kong after suffering seven years in a political prisoner camp at Kaechon.
1994
, an economist defected. In 2012 he was elected as a member of the South Korean National Assembly.
1996
Jeong Su-il, North Korean spy captured in 1996 and released in 2000, currently a historian in South Korea.
 1997
Hwang Jang-yop – former Chairman of the Standing Committee of the Supreme People's Assembly. Hwang is the highest ranking North Korean official to defect. Kim Dok-hong, his aide, defected with him.
Jang Yeong-jin – a former soldier and the only openly gay North Korean defector.
Lee Hyeon-seo, defected in 1997 and currently lives in Seoul as a student, wrote The Girl with Seven Names about her escape from North Korea and later guiding her family out of North Korea through China and Laos.
Yoo Sang-joon, defected to China, later arrived in South Korea and from there helped smuggle his son from China and Mongolia to South Korea.
 1999
Yun Myung-chan – former North Korean international footballer and manager of the North Korean national football team.
 Jang Gil-su – fled North Korea at age 15, and became famous in South Korea following publication there and in the U.S. media of his chilling crayon drawings, which depict horrific abuses by North Korean authorities against North Korean civilians.
 Park Sang-hak – Worked in a propaganda unit of the Kim Il-sung Socialist Youth League until his family fled to South Korea. His work to spread information into North Korea resulted in an assassination attempt in 2011. Participated in the Oslo Freedom Forum in 2009 and has released balloons from South Korea through Fighters for a Free North Korea resulting in multiple arrests.
Kim Seong-min, defected in 1997 after he was accused of espionage and sentenced to death, arrived in South Korea in 1999. Founded Free North Korea Radio.

2000s
 2000
Paek Se-yun, a member of the Supreme People's Assembly defected.
 2001
Choi Kwang-hyouk, defected after his left leg was amputated below the knee by doctors after a train accident, won the bronze medal in para ice hockey at the 2018 Winter Paralympics.
 2002
Kyong Won-ha – Chief scientist of North Korea's nuclear program, defected to the West, taking with him many of the secrets of the atomic program pioneered since 1984. He was one of 20 scientists and military officers who were smuggled out of North Korea during the alleged Operation Weasel.
Jin Gyeong-suk – arrived in South Korea in 2002. She was later abducted two years later and forcefully deported back to North Korea, where she was tortured and died in custody in January 2005.
Joo Seong-ha, defected in 2002, currently a journalist with The Dong-a Ilbo.
 2003
Kim Cheol-woong, a classically trained musician defected. and has performed in the United States.
Jeong Kwang-il, former prisoner, defected in 2003 and currently smuggles films, soap operas, and entertainment on DVDs and USB thumb drives (some of which contain an offline copy of Wikipedia) into North Korea.
 2004
Mun Ki-nam, former international footballer and manager of both the North Korea women and North Korea men's national football teams defected.
 Jang Jin-sung, a psychological warfare officer within the United Front Department of the Korean Workers' Party defected.  
 2005
 Shin Dong-hyuk – Due to North Korea's policy of collective punishment, Shin was born imprisoned at the Kaechon internment camp. In 2005, he escaped the camp and fled to China where a journalist helped fly him to South Korea.
 2006
 Ji Seong-ho – a human rights activist defected. In 2020 he was elected as a member of the South Korean National Assembly.
 Yuna Jung - a former Generals Daughter. Arrived in South Korea in July 2006 from Thailand.
 2007
 Li Gyong-hui – a former Olympic gymnast defected.
 2009
 Yeonmi Park – a human rights activist defected.

2010s
 2014
Lim Ji-hyun – became a popular television personality after defecting to South Korea, went missing in 2017 before resurfacing in a series of North Korean interviews, prompting fears she had been abducted and returned to the country.

 2015
Pak Sung-won, a member of the Supreme People's Assembly and Army general defected.
Kim Kuk-sung, a colonel from North Korea's Reconnaissance General Bureau intelligence agency defected. South Korean authorities said that the colonel had been responsible for supervising espionage efforts against the South. Senior-level defections are rare, though no motive was released regarding this defection.
 2016
Lee Chul-eun – A former high ranking government official working for the North Korean Ministry of State Security, defected to South Korea with a friend by swimming across the Yellow Sea.
 Thae Yong-ho, North Korea's Deputy ambassador to the United Kingdom defected with his wife and children. In 2020 he was elected as a member of the South Korean National Assembly.
 2017
 Oh Chong-song fled North Korea at the Joint Security Area on 13 November 2017.  North Korean soldiers fired over 40 rounds at Oh, and he was struck five times. He survived the shooting, was rescued by South Korean soldiers, and his condition stabilized at a South Korean hospital after treatment for bullet wounds and multiple intestinal parasitic worms.
Han Jin Myung, North Korea's Ambassador to Vietnam defected.

2018
Jo Song-gil, North Korea's Ambassador to Italy defected.

2019
Ryu Hyun-woo, North Korea's Ambassador to Kuwait defected.

2020s 

 2020
 Unidentified former gymnast, scaled a barbed wire fence and surrendered to South Korean military personnel. Despite the border being heavily monitored and fortified, it was determined that some of the motion sensors had loose screws that caused them to fail to detect the man as he crawled past. The incident prompted a review of all of the sensors along the DMZ border.

See also
 North Koreans in South Korea
 South Korean defectors

References

History of North Korea
Korean migration

North Korean in South Korea
Defectors in South Korea
North Korea defectors
North Korea-related lists